Pinglu District is a district of the city of Shuozhou, Shanxi province, China, bordering Inner Mongolia to the northwest.

Climate

References

External links
www.xzqh.org 

County-level divisions of Shanxi
Shuozhou